The Albanian Futsal Cup is the second most important event in Albanian futsal, after the League. It was founded in 2011 and 8 best teams of the season took part. KS Ali Demi were crowned winners of the first Cup, beating 5 times futsal champions Tirana by penalties 4–3, after regular and extra time finished in a 2–2 draw. The final was played out on December 24, 2011, and took place in Asllan Rusi Sports Palace in Tirane. The 2016 final played on May 3, 2016 between Ali Demi and Tirana ended 9–5, with Ali Demi triumphing once again with the same opponent and lifting their record 4th cup.

After a long pause, the Cup returned in January 2023 with its 6th edition. 8 teams took part and Futsal Club Tirana won their second trophy, defeating Diamanti Futsal 5-0 in the final. It was played on 29th January in the "Goga Complex" in Durrës.

KS Ali Demi are the most successful team with 4 trophies won.

Winners

 2011 KS Ali Demi
 2012 Futsal Klub Tirana
 2014 KS Ali Demi
 2015 KS Ali Demi
 2016 KS Ali Demi
 2023 Futsal Klub Tirana

See also
Albanian Cup, football men's cup

References

External links
KS Ali Demi win the very first Futsal Cup

Futsal competitions in Albania
National futsal cups